451st may refer to:

451st Air Expeditionary Wing, a provisional United States Air Force Air Combat Command unit, currently in Afghanistan
451st Expeditionary Sustainment Command (ESC) is a subordinate command of 79th Sustainment Support Command
451st Flying Training Squadron, active United States Air Force unit
451st Intelligence Squadron, intelligence unit located at RAF Menwith Hill, United Kingdom

See also
451 (number)
451, the year 451 (CDLI) of the Julian calendar
451 BC